Christian Filostrat (born 1945 ) is an American diplomat, recipient of the 1994 Presidential Award and a writer, author of Variations on Unjust Times, The Gospel of Thomas , and Jerome's Pillows. The Beggars’ Pursuit is a novel about relations between the United States and Zaire’s Mobutu Sese Seko. The Last Day of Frantz Fanon is based on discussions Filostrat held with Fanon’s wife, Josie Fanon. The book concludes with an interview about her husband. During 1990–1991 he attended the National War College, Washington, D.C.

A Négritude specialist, Filostrat researches in the field of politics and literature in the French-speaking Caribbean and the oral tradition and the literature of Africa. Filostrat assesses in what manner European colonialism upended the civilizations of Africa and affected the people’s lives.  He examines the disadvantages imposed on Africa by male-dominated societies and indicates that improvement will not be discernible until African women achieve a modicum of equality.

He is widely known for his "Negritude Agonistes", having collaborated closely with the Negritude founders, Léon Damas, Léopold Sédar Senghor, and Aimé Césaire to document their works and thoughts. In The Beggars’ Pursuit he retells their personal lives in Paris circa 1935, their foundation of the Negritude movement and their activities at the time of the creation of L’Etudiant Noir, the publication in which Negritude saw first light. He was Damas’s sounding board while Damas was composing his last collection of poems, Mine de Riens. Filostrat organized Damas’s funeral in Washington, D.C., and carried the ashes to Martinique for the eulogy by Aimé Césaire.

Filostrat is the author of Racial Consciousness and the Social Revolution of Aimé Césaire and at the request of President Senghor lectured on the subject at the University of the Mutants on Gorée island in Senegal in 1980. In Negritude Agonistes, Filostrat introduces issue No. 3 (May–June 1935) of L'Etudiant Noir, Journal Mensuel de l'Association des Étudiants Martiniquais en France (The Black Student, Monthly Journal of the Martiniquan Student Association in France), in which Aimé Césaire coined the expression and defined the concept of Négritude. Christopher l. Miller, Frederick Clifford Ford Professor of African American Studies and French at Yale University, said: "In 2008 Christian Filostrat published a book that contains negritude’s missing link: an article by Césaire in L’étudiant noir, number 3, May–June 1935."

Bibliography
 The Beggars' Pursuit, 2007
 Negritude Agonistes, 2008
   The Gospel of Thomas, 2011
   Jerome's Pillows, 2015
   Variations on Unjust Times, 2016
   The Last Day of Frantz Fanon/Le Dernier Jour de Frantz Fanon, 2017

References
Notes

Bibliography

 "Frantz Fanon" www.frantzfanon.com

External links
Poésie de Léon G. Damas, "Mine de Riens".
Christian Filostrat, "Négritude Agonistes".
Christian Filostrat, "The Stories of Chris Filostrat".
"NÉGRITUDE THE ORIGIN".
["Christian Filostrat Blog" https://www.blogger.com/profile/09100255585680903416 ]

1945 births
American diplomats
American non-fiction writers
Living people